Strand Church is a parish church of the Church of Norway in Stor-Elvdal Municipality in Innlandet county, Norway. It is located in the village of Strand. It is the church for the Strand parish which is part of the Sør-Østerdal prosti (deanery) in the Diocese of Hamar. The white, wooden church was built in a rectangular design in 1863 using plans drawn up by the architect Jacob Wilhelm Nordan. The church seats about 300 people.

History
Approval was finally granted in the early 1860s. Jacob Wilhelm Nordan was hired to design the new church. Construction began in April 1863 and it progressed through the summer and fall. The church is rectangular in design with the nave and choir in the same room. There's a small sacristy on the east end and a church porch with tower on the west end. The new church was consecrated on 2 December 1863.

Media gallery

See also
List of churches in Hamar

References

Stor-Elvdal
Churches in Innlandet
Rectangular churches in Norway
Wooden churches in Norway
19th-century Church of Norway church buildings
Churches completed in 1863
1863 establishments in Norway